William Henry Robertson (October 10, 1823 Bedford, Westchester County, New York – December 6, 1898 Katonah, Westchester Co., NY), also known as W. H. Robertson, was an American lawyer and politician from New York.

Robertson was known to have allied with the GOP Half-Breed faction, which as a whole supported moderate civil service reform and emphasized the issues of protectionist tariffs as well as industry.

Life
He was the son of Henry Robertson ( 1881). He received an academic education, studied law, and began practice in his native town.

He was a Whig member of the New York State Assembly (Westchester Co., 1st D.) in 1849 and 1850; and of the New York State Senate (7th D.) in 1854 and 1855. He was Judge of the Westchester County Court from 1856 to 1866. He joined the Republican Party upon its organization in 1855, and was a presidential elector in 1860, voting for Abraham Lincoln and Hannibal Hamlin.

Robertson was elected as a Republican to the 40th United States Congress, holding office from March 4, 1867, to March 3, 1869. He was again a member of the State Senate from 1872 to 1881, sitting in the 95th, 96th, 97th, 98th, 99th, 100th, 101st, 102nd (all eight 9th D.), 103rd and 104th New York State Legislatures (both 12th D.). In 1874, after a constitutional amendment created it as a standing office, he was chosen President pro tempore of the New York State Senate. He remained on this post until his retirement from the Senate in May 1881 upon his federal appointment.

In 1881, he was appointed Collector of the Port of New York by President James Garfield whose nomination he had helped to secure by leading a part of the New York delegation at the 1880 Republican National Convention to desert the Grant column.  Robertson's nomination to the collectorship, made without consulting the wishes of the two Republican U.S. Senators, Roscoe Conkling and Thomas C. Platt, and, according to their claims, in violation of the President's pledge, led to the resignation of the two senators and resulted in a serious party split. In the bitter struggle between the Stalwart and the Half-Breed factions which followed, Robertson was active in the campaign that resulted in the election of new senators in the place of Conkling and Platt. Robertson was a delegate to the 1884 Republican National Convention, and held the collectorship until 1885. Afterwards, he resumed his law practice.

He was again a member of the State Senate (12th D.) from 1888 to 1891, sitting in the 111th, 112th, 113th and 114th New York State Legislatures.

Stalwarts vs. Half-Breeds, President Garfield hands post to Robertson
During the 1880 presidential election, a three-way battle initially emerged between the Blaine faction, Half-Breeds, and conservative pro-spoils system Stalwarts led by Conkling. The Stalwarts favored a third non-consecutive term for Radical Republican former president Ulysses S. Grant, while speculating that the Blaine faction would push through a nomination of their leader James G. Blaine. Robertson was a leader of the anti-Grant forces, and voiced his staunch support for Blaine.

Ultimately, an alliance between the Blaine faction and Half-Breeds successfully nominated dark house candidate James A. Garfield, who promised to appease the Stalwart agenda during the campaign to ensure party unity. Once elected president, Garfield betrayed his vows, an example being his appointment of Robertson to New York Collector of the Port and customhouse head without consulting Sen. Conkling in a rebuke of the latter's political machine.

According to historian Heather Cox Richardson, Conkling was "undoubtedly personally affronted." The Stalwart leader voiced opposition towards Garfield's appointment of Robertson by arguing that presidents were expected to obtain the agreement of senators from the states they sought to give positions to, though Richardson asserted:

Conkling and his New York senatorial colleague Thomas C. Platt resigned from their seats in protest, expecting to be immediately elected to their same positions by the state legislature that would serve as a rebuke to President Garfield. They instead were simply outmaneuvered by the Half-Breeds within the legislature, which ended Conkling's career in politics.

References
 Autobiography of Thomas Collier Platt (edited by L. J. Lang, New York, 1910)

Sources
 

People from Bedford, New York
1823 births
1898 deaths
Members of the New York State Assembly
New York (state) state senators
1860 United States presidential electors
Majority leaders of the New York State Senate
Collectors of the Port of New York
New York (state) Whigs
Republican Party members of the United States House of Representatives from New York (state)
People from Katonah, New York
19th-century American politicians
Half-Breeds (Republican Party)